Erick R. Almonte (born February 1, 1978) is a Dominican former professional baseball shortstop. He played in Major League Baseball (MLB) for the New York Yankees and Milwaukee Brewers, and in Nippon Professional Baseball (NPB) for the Hokkaido Nippon-Ham Fighters. He is currently the hitting coach for the Florida Complex League Cardinals.

Playing career
Almonte was signed by the New York Yankees as an amateur free agent in 1996. He spent four years in the minors before getting called up in 2001. He made his debut on September 4, 2001. After spending the 2002 season in the Yankees minor league system, he was called up in 2003 after Derek Jeter suffered an injury, and was the team's starting shortstop until Jeter returned.

Almonte spent the 2004 season in the Colorado Rockies organization after getting released by the Yankees. In November 2004, the Cleveland Indians signed him to a minor league contract, but, without playing any games, they sold his contract to the Hokkaido Nippon Ham Fighters of Japan's Pacific League. In 2006, he played for the Long Island Ducks of the Atlantic League.

On October 31, 2007, he signed a minor league deal with the Detroit Tigers. He became a free agent after the 2008 season and signed a minor league contract with the Chicago Cubs in January 2009. He became a free agent during spring training, and the signed a minor league contract with the Milwaukee Brewers. He played the entire 2009 and 2010 seasons with the Triple-A Nashville Sounds. His minor league contract was purchased by the Brewers at the conclusion of spring training in 2011.  Almonte hit his first home run in nearly 10 years for the Brewers against the Reds on Saturday, April 2, 2011. He was outrighted to Triple-A Nashville on June 3, 2011.

Coaching career
Almonte will serve as the manager of the St. Louis Cardinals' rookie Gulf Coast League Cardinals in 2018.

He was named manager of the Peoria Chiefs for the 2019 season.

Personal
His brother, Héctor, played in the majors in 1999 and 2003 for the Florida Marlins, Boston Red Sox, and Montreal Expos.

On April 26, 2011, Almonte became the first player to be placed on MLB's concussion-based 7-day disabled list.

References

External links

1978 births
Living people
Águilas Cibaeñas players
Colorado Springs Sky Sox players
Columbus Clippers players
Dominican Republic expatriate baseball players in Japan
Dominican Republic expatriate baseball players in Mexico
Dominican Republic expatriate baseball players in the United States
Erie SeaWolves players
Gigantes del Cibao players
Greensboro Bats players
Gulf Coast Yankees players
Hokkaido Nippon-Ham Fighters players
Leones del Escogido players
Long Island Ducks players
Major League Baseball players from the Dominican Republic
Major League Baseball shortstops
Mexican League baseball first basemen
Mexican League baseball shortstops
Mexican League baseball third basemen
Milwaukee Brewers players
Minor league baseball coaches
Minor league baseball managers
Nashville Sounds players
New York Yankees players
Nippon Professional Baseball second basemen
Nippon Professional Baseball shortstops
Norwich Navigators players
Rieleros de Aguascalientes players
Sportspeople from Santo Domingo
Tampa Yankees players
Toledo Mud Hens players